List of U.S. communities with African-American majority populations may refer to:
 List of U.S. communities with African-American majority populations in 2000
 List of U.S. communities with African-American majority populations in 2010
 List of U.S. communities with African-American majority populations in 2020

African American
African American-related lists
Lists of lists